Magne Rommetveit (born 27 April 1956) is a Member of Parliament for the Norwegian Labour Party. Rommetveit is elected from Hordaland County. He was formerly Mayor (1992–2007) and Assistant City Administrator (2008–2009) of Stord Municipality.

Magne Rommetveit grew up in the Time municipality in Jæren, where his father worked as a teacher. Rommetveit is also a teacher, and has a background in youth work.

External links
 TV2 - Presentation of the candidate.

People from Stord
People from Bryne
1956 births
Living people
Members of the Storting
Labour Party (Norway) politicians
Hordaland politicians
21st-century Norwegian politicians